Aqcheh Mazar (also Romanized as Āqcheh Mazār, Āghcheh Mazār, Āghjeh Mazār; also known as Aqa Mazār) is a village in Zahray-ye Pain Rural District, in the Central District of Buin Zahra County, Qazvin Province, Iran. At the 2006 census, its population was 436, in 113 families.

References 

Populated places in Buin Zahra County